Revision is the process of revising.
More specifically, it may refer to:
 Update, a modification of software or a database
 Revision control, the management of changes to sets of computer files
 ReVisions, a 2004 anthology of alternate history short stories
 Revision3, a San Francisco based Internet television network
 Revision (Boxcar album) a remix music album by synthpop group Boxcar
Revisions (album), an album by the band 3
 Revision (demoparty), a demoparty which takes place on Easter in Saarbrücken, Germany
 "Revisions" (Stargate SG-1), an episode of the Stargate SG-1 science-fiction television series
 Revisions (anime) a 2019 anime television series
 Final Articles Revision Convention (disambiguation), either of two International Labour Organisation conventions
 Revision or revising, a British term for exam preparation
 Taxonomic revision is a novel analysis of the variation patterns in a particular taxon
 Revision (writing), the general process of revising written work, or a version produced by that process

See also
Revisionism (disambiguation)